William Joseph Hassett (October 21, 1921 – November 15, 1992) was an American professional basketball player.

A 5'11" guard from the University of Notre Dame, where he also lettered in baseball, he was a consensus first team All American selection in 1945 and a second team selection in 1946. Hassett played five seasons (1946–51) in the National Basketball League, the Professional Basketball League of America, and the National Basketball Association as a member of the Buffalo Bisons, Tri-Cities Blackhawks, the Chicago Gears, the Minneapolis Lakers, and the Baltimore Bullets. He averaged 4.5 points per game professionally in the NBA. He won an NBA championship with the Lakers in 1950 with teammate George Mikan.  

Billy was the leading scorer for the Blackhawks with 15 points in the first game in history of the NBA as a member of the Tri-Cities Blackhawks. Bob Brown on the Nuggets led all scorers with 16 points.  The game was played on October 29, 1949 against to old Denver Nuggets. 

Hassett also played one year for the Georgetown Hoyas in 1942–43 (All American selection), playing in the NCAA Championship against Wyoming in 1943. Hassett played for the AAU Dow Chemics in 1944 after Georgetown dropped basketball due to World War II. He transferred to Notre Dame in 1945. Hassett managed the 24 second clock the first time it was used in the NBA at a Syracuse Nationals game. His brother, John Aloysious "Buddy" Hassett, played Major League Baseball for the Brooklyn Dodgers, the Boston Bees and Braves and the New York Yankees (1936–1942).

References

External links
 
 Peach Basket Society profile

1921 births
1992 deaths
All-American college men's basketball players
Amateur Athletic Union men's basketball players
American men's basketball players
Baltimore Bullets (1944–1954) players
Basketball players from New York (state)
Buffalo Bisons (NBL) players
Georgetown Hoyas men's basketball players
Guards (basketball)
La Salle Academy alumni
Minneapolis Lakers players
Notre Dame Fighting Irish men's basketball players
Notre Dame Fighting Irish baseball players
Professional Basketball League of America players
Tri-Cities Blackhawks players